Rao Sahib T S Korde (1886 - 19??) was a leader and landlord from Murtizapur, Akola in Central Provinces, British India.

He was a M. L. C., as the member of First and Second Legislative Council of Central Provinces and Berar during 1921-23 and 1923–1926.

References

People from Akola district
1886 births
Year of death missing
Indian landlords